Lauramie Township is one of thirteen townships in Tippecanoe County, Indiana, United States. As of the 2010 census, its population was 2,596 and it contained 1,021 housing units.

Geography

Cities, towns, villages
 Clarks Hill

Unincorporated communities
 Concord at 
 Gladens Corner at 
 Monroe at 
 Stockwell at 
(This list is based on USGS data and may include former settlements.)

Extinct towns
 Beeville

Adjacent townships
 Sheffield Township (north)
 Madison Township, Clinton County (northeast)
 Perry Township, Clinton County (east)
 Washington Township, Clinton County (east)
 Sugar Creek Township, Montgomery County (south)
 Madison Township, Montgomery County (southwest)
 Randolph Township (west)
 Wea Township (northwest)

Cemeteries
The township contains these eight cemeteries: Clark, Concord, Fairview, Johnson, Saint Joe, Stingley, Union and Yorktown.

Major highways
  Interstate 65
  US Route 52

Airports and landing strips
 Timber House Airport

School districts
 Tippecanoe School Corporation

Political districts
 Indiana's 4th congressional district
 State House District 41
 State Senate District 22

References
 United States Census Bureau 2007 TIGER/Line Shapefiles
 United States Board on Geographic Names (GNIS)
 United States National Atlas

External links
 Indiana Township Association
 United Township Association of Indiana

Townships in Tippecanoe County, Indiana
Lafayette metropolitan area, Indiana
Townships in Indiana